is a Japanese boys' love visual novel game created by BlueImpact, which was originally released on April 25, 2003, for Windows, and later ported to the PlayStation 2 by HuneX as Angel's Feather: Kuro no Zanei. In 2006, it was adapted into an OVA, which was animated by Studio Venet. The game's character designer is Yamamoto Kazue. In 2007, Media Blasters licensed the anime for Region 1 release.

Story 
It begins when Hamura Shou comes to Yuusei Academy, from there it branches out into the truth behind his past, and his twin brother, Kai's as well (though they both have the same name, they are referenced differently). It also portrays shōnen-ai between Kai and Nagi (his supposed best friend).

Characters

 Shou Hamura 
 
Shou Hamura (羽村 翔) is the older twin of Kai, despite looking younger.  He came to the Yuusei Academy for boys as a sports student.  In the beginning, when Shou was mentioned that his lost twin brother, Kai was in the same school, Shou went looking for Kai first, only to find out that Kai had completely forgotten about his older twin.  Shou was adopted into a wealthy family, but unfortunately, his parents were killed in an accident.  Despite this tragedy of losing his adoptive parents, he wields the personality as a strong, courageous,  happy and friendly boy.  He is the leader of the Kendo team in his school, as well as being the prince of the Winfield kingdom, giving him his white wings on his back.  Shou's appearance is usually a boy with short, brown hair, green eyes and fair skin.  Shou shares the same birth date with Kai, March 7.

 Kai Misonou 
 
Kai Misonou (御園生 櫂) is Shou's younger twin.  Kai starts off seeing his forgotten twin brother, and has a blurry memory of the time with Shou while they were at the orphanage before Kai was adopted into a wealthy family which runs the Misonou Combine.  What made Kai to forget Shou is that Shou had told Kai to forget about him completely so Kai will not get sad about saying farewell to his beloved twin.  Kai is in a relationship with his best friend Nagi, who was found in a faculty since they were small.  Kai's family is controlled by Ran, who is Reiya's retainer, which leads to the fact why Kai knows Ran.  After Nagi was killed (But revealed that Nagi survived, but have gotten a supposed amnesia), he went berserk, but got saved by his older twin.  It was later mentioned that Kai switched his school to the Yuusei Academy because of his excellent grades.  Kai is also the prince of the Winfield kingdom, giving him the same white wings as his twin brother, and fights by using magic.  There are some hints that Kai and Shou are fraternal twins.  They share the same eye color and hair color.  The difference is that Kai has sharper eyes, longer hair and a deeper voice than his twin brother.  Kai has the same birth date as Shou.

 Kurisu (Christopher) Ousaka 
 
His full name is Christopher. Kurisu is Shou and Kai's cousin, to the fact that his father's brother was the father of Kai and Shou. He is the Crown Prince of Winfield Kingdom. In episode 1, Chris is seen as a roommate with Kai, although it seems that there's more to their relationship. Like his cousins, Chris is white-winged, and later escapes with Sena and Shion from Winfield Kingdom. His birthday is on October 12.

 Naoto Aoki 
 
Naoto is Shou's best friend and knew Shou before he moved to Yuusei academy and is also in the kendo club with Shou. He is later revealed as a black-winged; the royal white-winged's enemy. For this, Shou's feelings are badly hurt for losing his best friend.

 Nagi Uesugi 
 
Nagi is Kai's "Only friend" and may be in a relationship with Kai. He appears near the end of the 1st episode. He vows to protect Kai from anyone who hurts him, He hates Shou for hurting Kai. In episode 2 he is apparently "killed" to protect Kai from his own attack when he is controlled by Ran. Nagi was awakened as a black-winged in episode 2.

 Yuuto Nakajyou 
 
He's the dorm leader, and worries about the occupants of the dorm. He has special abilities that allows him to see Nagi's desire of wanting to protect Kai in the 2nd episode.

 Anri Chikura 
 
He is a friend of Shou who continuously repeats words at least three times. though kind hearted he is not very bright and plays the flute to heal wounds and to rid monsters such as the werewolves in the second episode and heal Shou's wounds in the 1st episode. It is possible that Anri is a distant cousin of Shou, Kai and Kurisu because of his small white wings.

 Sena Mizuochi 
 
Sena is a soldier of Winfield Kingdom and one of the protector of Kurisu. He is also the counselor of the shooting club at Yuusei academy. A blue bird is often seen with him.

 Shion Toudou 
 , Hideo Ishikawa (18+ add-on)
He is the commanding officer of the imperial guard to the kingdom and another protector of Kurisu, He is a teacher at the academy. He is quite calm and is loyal to Kurisu.

 Reiya Wakabayashi 
 
He is the Commander of the Black Wings and also the director of the school. He is the one controlling Kai as a puppet, he also secretly controls Misonou Combine. Ran is his lover and trusted retainer.

 Ran Sakakibara 
 
He is the homeroom teacher of Kai and the others. He is also a black-winged and the trusted trainer and lover of the commander of the black-winges.

 Karen Neyagawa 
 

 Ruka Niijima 
 

 Polyana Ninihopetestu 
 

 Kyouhei 
 
He has a book about Winfield Kingdom, he was curious about the monster that he and Shou encountered during the 1st episode. Near the ending of the 2nd episode OVA, he was able to visit Winfield Kingdom after he and Yuuto didn't not join Shou and the others to find the Black-wings. He is introduced in the first episode bullying Anri. He also seems to be the narrator of the story.

Media information 

Anime opening theme song:
"Rock Star" by Kakihara Tetsuya & Hatano Wataru

Anime ending theme song:
"Last Song" by Ishikawa Hideo & Suzuki Chihiro

Reception 
Helen McCarthy put the OVA into her book 500 Essential Anime Movies.

References

External links 
 
 Angel's Feather: Kuro no Zan'ei official game website
 OVA review at Mania.com
 Shelf Life - OVA Review Anime News Network
 Game information at IGN
 
 

2003 video games
2006 anime OVAs
Action anime and manga
Works based on video games
Drama anime and manga
Fantasy anime and manga
Japan-exclusive video games
PlayStation 2 games
Video games developed in Japan
Visual novels
Windows games
Yaoi anime and manga
Yaoi video games
HuneX games